Tottenham Green is an electoral ward within the London Borough of Haringey in Greater London, England.

According to the 2001 Census, the population of Tottenham Green is around 12,000, in around 5,500 homes. Around 2,900 homes do not own a car. Just under 2,000 of the population are Muslims. The population at the 2011 Census increased to 14,580 in 5,925 homes.

Those living in the ward have a life expectancy seven years less than someone living in nearby Highgate; the area has a significant and entrenched problem with guns, drugs, arson, burglaries and anti-social behaviour. The high rate of violent and petty crime in Tottenham Green has remained fairly stable over the past six years. (Source: Key Findings of the 2004 Crime & Drugs Audit Report, Haringey Council).

The area has a large new sports & leisure centre, and good transport connections.

The Government's Indices of Deprivation (2004) reported Tottenham Green to be among the top 20 per cent of deprived areas in England. Despite the high levels of poverty, Council Tax is said to be among the highest in the UK. The area is a Labour Party stronghold.

References

External links
 Haringey Council Map showing Haringey ward boundaries
 Victoria County History: History of Tottenham before 1850
 Victoria County History: History of Tottenham after 1850
 Tottenham Green Enterprise Centre

Wards of the London Borough of Haringey